War Machine (James Rupert "Rhodey" Rhodes)  is a fictional character, a superhero appearing in American comic books published by Marvel Comics. James Rhodes first appeared in Iron Man #118 (January 1979) by David Michelinie and John Byrne. The War Machine armor (Iron Man Armor Model 11) which first appeared in Iron Man #281 (June 1992) became his signature exosuit, created by Len Kaminski and Kevin Hopgood.

The character has been featured in animated television series and films. In the Marvel Cinematic Universe (MCU), James Rhodes was first played by Terrence Howard in Iron Man (2008), which takes place before he took on the War Machine mantle, and then by Don Cheadle in Iron Man 2 (2010), Iron Man 3 (2013), Avengers: Age of Ultron (2015), Captain America: Civil War (2016), Avengers: Infinity War (2018), Captain Marvel (2019), Avengers: Endgame (2019), the television series The Falcon and the Winter Soldier (2021) and Secret Invasion (2023), the animated series What If...? (2021) and the upcoming film Armor Wars.

Publication history
Initially a supporting character in volume one of Iron Man, Rhodes later assumed the mantle of Iron Man after Tony Stark's relapse into alcoholism in issue #170 (May 1983). The character would continue in a supporting role and later resume the role of Iron Man following Stark's purported death in issue #284 (Sept. 1992). After Stark's return to the role of Iron Man, Rhodes continued as the superhero War Machine and made his solo series debut in an eponymous title after being featured as a supporting character in the superhero-team series Avengers West Coast.

In addition to Iron Man and his own title War Machine, Rhodes has been featured in the ensemble titles West Coast Avengers; Force Works by Dan Abnett and Andy Lanning; Sentinel Squad O*N*E; The Crew by Christopher Priest; and Avengers: The Initiative by Dan Slott and Christos Gage. Rhodes was also featured in the alternate-reality Marvel MAX imprint's U.S. War Machine series by Chuck Austen, and U.S. War Machine 2.0, by Austen and Christian Moore.

In the series Iron Man: Director of S.H.I.E.L.D., Rhodes was featured in the storyline "War Machine: Weapon of S.H.I.E.L.D." written by Gage and artist Sean Chen. In this tie-in to the company-wide storyline "Secret Invasion," War Machine replaced Iron Man as the protagonist for the final three issues of the series. This led into a second War Machine ongoing series, written by Greg Pak with art by Leonardo Manco, which lasted 12 issues. War Machine appeared as a regular character in the 2010–2013 Secret Avengers series, from issue #1 (July 2010) through issue #21 (March 2012), and guest starred in issues #26–28 during the "Avengers vs. X-Men" storyline. Rhodes was the lead character of the 2011–12 series Iron Man 2.0 by writer Nick Spencer. The most recent series focusing on Rhodes was Iron Patriot, an All-New Marvel NOW! title by writer Ales Kot and artist Garry Brown. The series lasted five issues before cancellation.

Fictional character biography

Origins
James "Rhodey" Rhodes, from the South Philadelphia section of Philadelphia, Pennsylvania, was a lieutenant in the United States Marine Corps who served tours of duty in Southeast Asia. A combat pilot, he was stranded in the jungle behind enemy lines after his helicopter was shot down by Viet Cong rocket fire. He encounters Tony Stark, who escaped from Wong-Chu's prison camp in his prototype suit of powered armor, for the first time. Defeating the Viet Cong soldiers that ambushed them, Rhodes and Iron Man discovered an enemy rocket base that was the origin of the rocket fire that grounded Rhodes in the first place. Destroying the base with a stolen Viet Cong helicopter, Rhodes and Iron Man fly the helicopter back to the American defense perimeter. At the base hospital in Saigon, Stark arrives in person to thank Rhodes for helping Iron Man and to offer Rhodes a job as his personal pilot. After the Vietnam War was over and after taking several career paths including mercenary work, Rhodes finally took Stark's offer and became Stark's personal pilot, chief aviation engineer for Stark International and one of Stark's closest friends.

The all new Iron Man
Due to Obadiah Stane's actions, Stark International was losing foreign contracts and going into heavy debt. With Stark's company and personal life in disarray, Stark relapsed into alcoholism. After an intoxicated Stark was defeated by Magma, Rhodes donned the Iron Man armor for the first time and defeated Magma. Neither he nor Stark International scientist Morley Erwin fully understood Stark's technology, but over time the two learned enough that Stark asked Rhodes to take his place as Iron Man. Rhodes and Erwin quit Stark International and sent the remaining Iron Man armors into the ocean to protect Stark's technology from Stane and S.H.I.E.L.D., who monitored the Stane takeover. Erwin maintained the Iron Man armor and served as Rhodes' technical support while Rhodes fought villains such as the Mandarin, Thunderball, the Zodiac, and the Radioactive Man as Iron Man. He fought in the Beyonder's "Secret Wars"  and became a charter member of the West Coast Avengers. Rhodes, Erwin, and Morley's sister Dr. Clytemnestra Erwin planned to create a new electronics firm based in California. Rhodes took mercenary jobs to provide money for the armor's upkeep and to fund the company. Recovering from his alcoholism, Tony Stark joined the three and they formed the company Circuits Maximus. Due to the armor's helmet being tailored to Stark's brainwaves, Rhodes developed headaches and grew more erratic and aggressive. Stark helped Rhodes maintain the armor, but Rhodes' paranoia and hatred made him believe that Stark wanted to retake the armor. During a battle with Vibro, Rhodes went on a rampage to capture the villain and Stark was forced to wear his new testbed armor (resembling Stark's first Iron Man armor) to stop Rhodes and talk him out of his rage.

Rhodes sought help from Dr. Henry Pym to cure his headaches while Stark delivered Rhodes' resignation to the Avengers and revealed his identity to Hawkeye and Mockingbird. Pym sent Rhodes to Dr. Michael Twoyoungmen (Shaman of Alpha Flight) and Rhodes cured himself of his headaches via a journey through a mystic dimension called "The Gorge" that revealed Rhodes' guilt of feeling unworthy of the armor. While Rhodes was finally at peace and left his armor behind in the dimension, the armor was empowered by The Omnos, a being of extra-dimensional energy, and was returned to Rhodes. Rhodes resumed operating as Iron Man with Stark using his own testbed armor to assist Rhodes. Due to a bomb sent by Stane to Circuits Maximus that injured Rhodes and killed Morley Erwin, Stark became active as Iron Man again, donning his newly completed "Silver Centurion" model, and defeated Stane.

Out of the armor
Rhodes remained at Stark's side as Stark regained his personal fortune and built a new corporation, Stark Enterprises, remaining in California. Rhodes donned the red-and-gold armor once more when A.I.M. attacked the under-construction Stark space station. However, the armor's seals had been damaged in a shuttle explosion, causing Rhodes to suffer severe burns upon reentry; he survived only by Stark using his own armor as a heat shield to minimize Rhodes' exposure. After Rhodes recovered, he continued to play a key role in assisting Stark, particularly during the first Armor Wars storyline.

When Stark was shot by Kathy Dare and left paralyzed, he needed a fill-in for the role of Iron Man. Rhodes refused, citing the history between him and the armor, "not all of it good". Stark would call upon the former Force, Clay Wilson (known as Carl Walker at this point), to fill in, wearing the modified Stealth armor, until Stark could modify his regular armor to allow him to function normally inside the suit. Rhodes would reluctantly return to the armor to fight the Mandarin at the behest of the Chinese government, to allow Stark to seek medical assistance in their country. In the end, Stark (using a remote-control set of armor) and Rhodes team up with the Mandarin to stop the larger threat of the Makulan dragons.

Birth of War Machine (Iron Man Armor Model 11)
The Masters of Silence, three Japanese warriors tricked by Justin Hammer into attacking Iron Man, defeated Stark with technology that enabled them not to be affected by repulsors or unibeams. To combat the threat, Stark designed the "Variable Threat Response Battle Suit, Model XVI, Mark I" (nicknamed "War Machine"), a more heavily armed version of the Iron Man armor designed for all-out warfare. After Stark's apparent death in the comic book, he left Rhodes in control of Stark Enterprises as its new CEO, along with a new Variable Threat Response Battle Suit designed especially for Rhodes to continue the Iron Man legacy. As Iron Man once again, Rhodes used the armor and fought against threats such as the Living Laser, the second Spymaster, Blacklash, the Beetle, and Atom Smasher.

Upon the revelation that Stark was alive, Rhodes quit Stark Enterprises and the friendship between the two was fractured, Rhodes resenting how Stark had kept him in the dark about his continued survival even as Stark argued that the experiments that saved his life were purely experimental and he could not have risked anyone else guessing that he was alive if Rhodes' grief had appeared anything but genuine. After teaming with Iron Man against battledroids programmed to kill Rhodes, Stark wanted Rhodes to keep the Variable Threat Response Battle Suit, stating that the armor always belonged to Rhodes. Rhodes eventually kept the armor and later adopted the name of War Machine. When the robot Ultimo went on a rampage, Rhodes called together Harold "Happy" Hogan, Bethany Cabe, Eddie March, "Carl Walker" and Michael O'Brien to pilot various Iron Man armors to take down Ultimo as the Iron Legion. He rejoined the West Coast Avengers as War Machine and served with the team until he resigned after an argument with Iron Man during an Avengers team meeting.

During the beginning of the War Machine series, Rhodes was approached by Vincent Cetewayo, noted activist from the African country of Imaya and founder of the human rights organization Worldwatch Incorporated. Cetewayo offered Rhodes the position of Worldwatch's Executive Director, but the offer was declined. Cetewayo was kidnapped by Imayan forces led by the dictator President Eda Arul. Receiving no aid from S.H.I.E.L.D. or the Avengers, Rhodes traveled to Imaya as War Machine to free Cetewayo. Joined by Deathlok, the two evaded capture from a S.H.I.E.L.D. unit led by Major Bathsheva "Sheva" Joseph and joined the fight to liberate Imaya. Rhodes successfully led Imayan rebels into combat against Arul's forces, but failed to save Cetewayo from being killed by the Advisor, the apparent mastermind of Arul's rise to power. Shaken by the death of Cetewayo and finding something worth fighting for, Rhodes takes the position of Worldwatch's Executive Director and hired Sheva Joseph, who left S.H.I.E.L.D. after her assignment in Imaya.

In the Hands of the Mandarin crossover, Stark disapproved of the actions of War Machine in Imaya and demanded that Rhodes relinquish the armor when he returned to Stark Enterprises to get the specifications for his armor. The two men battled each other until the fight was stopped by Bethany Cabe, the Head Of Security for Stark Enterprises. While their armor was rebooting, the Mandarin captured Rhodes and Stark, discovering their identities. Century of the superhero team Force Works rescued Rhodes, but his armor was useless thanks to the Mandarin's anti-technology field. Rhodes and Stark reconciled and joined with Force Works to stop the Mandarin and his Avatars from using the Heart Of Darkness for their plans of conquest. Stark gave Rhodes the blueprints to the War Machine armor and a fully upgraded armor with new armaments was made. Rhodes continued to use the War Machine armor in a solo superhero career, occasionally fighting alongside Stark and Force Works.

The Warwear
After the events of the "Time War" storyline, in which Rhodes teamed up with Captain America, Bucky and Sgt. Nick Fury & his Howling Commandos to stop Neo-Nazis from sending modern weaponry to Nazi Germany, the War Machine armor was lost in the time stream. Rhodes returned to civilian life, but he ended up acquiring a brand new alien armor known as the Eidolon Warwear after meeting a mysterious woman named Skye and fighting an alien known as a Lictor. Skye was sent to teach Rhodes to use the Warwear and revealed that Rhodes was chosen to fight against Stark (who was under the control of Immortus disguised as Kang the Conqueror). Skye was fatally wounded by Dirge, another Eidolon Warrior sent by Immortus, and Rhodes defeated him in combat. Stark eventually breaks free of Immortus' control and sacrificed his life while Rhodes foiled Immortus' plot by using Dirge's Warwear to destroy the Starcore satellite armed with a chronographic weapon. S.H.I.E.L.D. was made aware of down, but Rhodes evaded capture. To protect Worldwatch, he resigns as executive director.

In Tales of the Marvel Universe, Rhodes rejoined Stark Enterprises to protect his friend's legacy while the Japanese company Fujikawa Industries bought out Stark Enterprises. Rhodes was kept around to help with the transition to Stark-Fujikawa. He was offered the job of President Of Corporate Liaison Operations, but kept away from Fujikawa's attempt to discover the secrets to Stark's Iron Man armor technology contained in a single gauntlet. Rhodes infiltrated the security system at Stark-Fujikawa's Research and Development facility, recovered the gauntlet, and purged the Fujikawa database of all Iron Man armor technology data by downloading the Eidolon Warwear directly into the Fujikawa computers to attack the system. Losing the armor as a result of the sabotage mission, Rhodes quits Stark-Fujikawa. After serving as one of Stark's trustees when Iron Man was presumed dead after the final battle with Onslaught, Rhodes starts his own marine salvage business called "Rhodes Recovery" and retires from superheroics.

Post-War Machine
Despite staying in retirement and focusing on his salvaging company, Rhodes assisted Stark on occasion. In volume three of Iron Man, he helped Stark defeat freelance mercenary and arms dealer Parnell Jacobs, who was masquerading as a villainous War Machine. A former friend and mercenary partner of Rhodes, Jacobs was under the employ of Sunset Bain and piloted a version of the War Machine armor based on armor parts that Jacobs found from the discarded original and reverse engineering by Stuart Clarke.

Due to mismanagement by his accountant and an extravagant lifestyle, Rhodes is left with depleted funds and files for bankruptcy. He is informed by the New York Police Department that his sister Jeanette "Star" Rhodes was killed in a notorious section of Brooklyn overridden with crime and drugs known as "Little Mogadishu". During a fight with some local thugs, he is helped by Josiah el Hajj Saddiq a.k.a. Josiah X, a local minister who is the son of the black Captain America. Josiah X helped Rhodes obtain footage of Jeanette's killers. With the police unable to apprehend, Rhodes captured his sister's murderers with NYPD narcotics officer Kevin "Kasper" Cole making the arrests. He discovers that the criminals that killed Jeanette were drug dealers working for the 66 Bridges, a powerful street gang with a big percentage of East Coast criminal operations. Rhodes unknowingly invested in the 66's front company Grace & Tumbalt, a black-owned corporation that created Little Mogadishu due to their gentrification efforts. During his campaign against the 66 Bridges, Rhodes crosses paths with Cole, who secretly fights crime as The White Tigerto gain arrests for a promotion to detective, and Danny Vincent (Manuel Vincente), an ex-spy known as Junta with allegiance only to himself. Joining forces with these two men along with Josiah X as Justice, Rhodes and The Crew took on the 66 Bridges gang and their CEO Nigel "Triage" Blacque.

Rhodes later becomes a key member of the Office of National Emergency (O*N*E) and the head combat instructor for Sentinel Squad O*N*E. He began developing doubts about the nature of his job, such as being ordered to arrest the Black Panther and Storm when they refused to sign SHRA.

Return
When Rhodes served as a military consultant at a base in Dubai, a terrorist attack left Rhodes severely injured. Stark arrived in Dubai and rebuilt him with new limbs, bionics, and cybernetics. Rhodes once again becomes War Machine and was made field commander and a director of Camp Hammond to help train SHRA registered recruits of the Fifty State Initiative program. When the Skrulls invaded Earth and unleashed a virus that disabled all Starktech systems along with Rhodes' life-support systems, he is forced to rely on Baron Von Blitzschlag's electrical powers to keep him alive while managing to activate a cluster of emergency generators in his armor that incorporated Stanetech parts in its design.

In the War Machine: Weapon Of S.H.I.E.L.D. storyline, Rhodes received a secret holographic message with coordinates after the global Starktech failure. Despite an intercepting Skrull fleet, Rhodes found a secret cloaked satellite in outer space with Suzanne "Suzi" Endo at the satellite ahead of him. Endo was there to help because of her background in cybernetics and Rhodes viewed another message from Stark revealing that Rhodes' armor, as well as the satellite, was independent from all Earth systems with Rhodes himself as a part of Stark's contingency plan. A Skrull fleet followed Rhodes to the satellite and Endo revealed that the satellite is a functional weapon with Rhodes being the key to its activation. With the satellite linked to Rhodes, it transformed into a giant "War Machine" robotic form. Destroying the Skrull fleet, he left the satellite to Russian airspace to destroy an escaping Skull ship. He made his way to a weapons depot in Tatischevo where the Winter Guard was protecting the nuclear weapons from the Skrulls. The Winter Guard ordered him to leave under the orders of the Russian military, but Rhodes ignored it and was captured on a Skrull warship. He escaped, and, with Endo's help, used the warship to destroy the Skrull fleet with the Winter Guard disobeying orders so that they could aid Rhodes. The last Super-Skrull attempted to detonate the nuclear warheads by turning himself into energy, but Rhodes used his armor's capabilities to absorb the energy.

"Dark Reign"
In "Dark Reign: New Nation", Rhodes faced Anton Aubuisson, a corrupt former French soldier with the Roxxon Energy Corporation in negotiations with the Anunquit tribe in western Canada. Rhodes defeated Aubuisson and discovered the use of Ultimo technology given to Aubuisson by Eaglestar International, a corrupt paramilitary defense contracting firm. This led to Rhodes traveling to Santo Marco and finding Parnell Jacobs, once believed to be killed by Stuart Clarke. Rhodes recruits Jacobs to be his "one-man pit crew" to stop Eaglestar's efforts after informing him that Jacobs' estranged wife Dr. Glenda Sandoval, a medic with Eaglestar, was in forced imprisonment. In a side story, a team under the direction of Bethany Cabe developed a clone body for Rhodes to take over. The team's facility was attacked and the clone body was taken by Norman Osborn. Rhodes, with support from Jacobs and Cabe, invades the Eaglestar headquarters in the nation of Aqiria. Rescuing Sandoval and dealing with threats such as the Dark Avenger Ares and civilians infected with Ultimo technology, Rhodes deduced that the Ultimo technology came from the United States where Ultimo was last seen. Rhodes took on the mission of destroying the Ultimo components with Sandoval, Cabe, Jacobs, former S.H.I.E.L.D. agent Jake Oh, and a returning Suzi Endo as "Team War Machine". The team faced the threat of Ultimo in the form of Morgan Stark, Tony Stark's cousin, with the help of Rhodes' former West Coast Avengers teammates and Norman Osborn in a temporary alliance. While Rhodes was captured after ruining Osborn's plan to make Ultimo his weapon, his team exposed the "Bainesville Ten", a group of high-ranking officials and industry captains responsible for worldwide crimes. Despite Osborn's efforts to distract from the indictment of the group by putting Rhodes on trial at The Hague for war crimes, Rhodes and his team foiled Osborn's scheme with Rhodes himself transferred to his clone body after saving the life of a child.

In the "Stark Disassembled" storyline, Rhodes went to Broxton, Oklahoma where Tony Stark was left in a persistent vegetative state. Following recorded instructions from Stark, Rhodes extracted wires from Pepper Potts' Rescue suit and connected Captain America's shield to the implant on Stark's chest, which would be started by Thor's lightning, to reboot Stark's brain.

Heroic Age/Iron Man 2.0
After the Siege storyline, War Machine joined the new Secret Avengers team, alongside Beast, Nova, Steve Rogers, Valkyrie, and Moon Knight.

Due to a government contract between Tony Stark's "Stark Resilent" company and The Pentagon, War Machine was assigned a new position as the US military's own "Iron Man". Now at the rank of Lieutenant Colonel, Rhodes is under the command of General Babbage, who has a personal grudge against Rhodes for his actions when he battled Ultimo and Norman Osborn in the previous War Machine series. His first assignment was to track down Palmer Addley, a former weapons designer for DARPA, the Defense Advanced Research Projects Agency. Addley is committing terrorist acts around the world, despite having been dead for months. When War Machine confronts the alleged dead man, Addley's response is to drop a nuclear weapon on him. Rhodes survives, but this prompts Tony Stark to replace his armor with a far more advanced model: the "Iron Man 2.0" armor.

During the Fear Itself storyline, War Machine is seen in Washington DC helping Ant-Man and Beast. War Machine learns from the Prince of Orphans that the "Eighth City" has been opened.

War Machine then travels to Beijing and assists the Immortal Weapons in closing the portal, but not before having to battle Iron Fist who was unintentionally interfering with their mission by blocking the Immortal Weapon's connection to the city due to having become possessed by Agamotto's power. With Dr. Strange's help, Iron Fist is brought down and the portal is safely closed.

Iron Man again
During an attempt by the Mandarin to take down Tony Stark financially and personally, Rhodey fakes his death in a fight with several members of Iron Man's rogue's gallery. Soon after, Tony Stark publicly announces his retirement as Iron Man as a strategy against Mandarin. Following Tony's retirement a new Iron Man has emerged, whose identity is secretly Rhodes. Rhodey remains in the Iron Man armor until the Mandarin is defeated, and it is later mentioned that Stark had confiscated the new Iron Man suit.

Marvel NOW!/The new Iron Patriot

With Tony off-world as a member of the new Guardians of the Galaxy, Rhodey is called on by Phil Coulson to consult S.H.I.E.L.D. after a group of Iron Patriot drones are hijacked by A.I.M. Coulson then recruits Rhodes to help stop the rogue Iron Patriot drones. Rhodes communicates with them, and they appear to follow his orders.

Rhodey later appears in a new armor patterned after the Iron Patriot suit. He attempts to apprehend Gambit after the mutant steals one of Tony's old suits of armor, but ends up letting him go after learning that he needed the technology to save the life of one of his friends.

Rhodey also appears to start a relationship with Carol Danvers.

Around this time, Rhodey is caught up in a plot where he is blackmailed by an armored terrorist and forced to assassinate the former president of the United States. With the help of his niece, Lila Rhodes, as well as his father, Rhodey manages to defeat the terrorists and thwart the assassination, but at the cost of his father's life.

Time Runs Out
Following an eight-month time skip seen in the Time Runs Out storyline, Rhodes has returned to using the War Machine armor and is a member of the Avengers. He mentally controls a squad of War Machine drones, which are used to help hunt down the fugitive members of the Illuminati.

All-New, All-Different Marvel
As part of Marvel's 2015/2016 All-New, All-Different Marvel branding, War Machine arrives at Stark Tower's Osaka branch to investigate Madame Masque's break-in. After contacting Tony Stark, War Machine leaves Stark Tower's Osaka branch. Then he enters an illegal night club run by Yukio where he asks her about the tech-based ninjas. Yukio states that she cannot say anything if she wants her business to stay afloat. After being threatened with the prospect of having the Avengers storming the place, Yukio points War Machine to a rather big and muscular man in a tuxedo who leaves the nightclub with two ladies entering the car with him. After tossing the car in the air upon grabbing it, War Machine starts to ask the muscular man some questions about the tech-based ninjas only for him to start being attacked by the females with him who are two of those tech-based ninjas as they prepare to attack. War Machine wakes up inside a warehouse where his War Machine armor was deactivated and strapped down. A woman named Tomoe enters the room with several ninjas where she mocks War Machine's presence as a cowardice of Iron Man. She then removes the War Machine armor from James Rhodes and makes it bulkier using the other components in the warehouse as she dons it. While warning James Rhodes that he has walked blindly into their world, Tomoe states that he will also be interrogated.

Civil War II and "death"
During the Civil War II storyline, War Machine is offered the position of Secretary of Defense by the President of the United States. War Machine assists the Ultimates and the Inhumans in ambushing Thanos at Project Pegasus after the recently emerged Inhuman Ulysses predicted that Thanos would target the Cosmic Cube there. During the battle, Thanos mortally injures Rhodes. In the aftermath, Iron Man is enraged at Captain Marvel that Ulysses' powers were used to ambush Thanos in an endeavor that cost them Rhodes' life.

Resurrection
Immediately prior to re-emerging as Iron Man after suffering near-fatal injuries at the end of the Civil War II storyline, it is revealed that the same DNA-altering methods Tony Stark has used to heal himself he has also employed on the body of Rhodes, effectively restoring him to life. They then return to action in tandem. However, Rhodes suffers from PTSD over dying in the suit and being heavily injured numerous times and chooses to quit as War Machine and instead pilots a larger mech suit called Manticore. He soon learned that Punisher had been using his previous War Machine suit to kill the remaining Hydra remnants due to being manipulated by them during their Secret Empire. Rhodes manages to convince Punisher to return his armor and surrender to the authorities.

During the "Iron Man 2020" event, War Machine tells the authorities that he does not know where Tony Stark is. The artificial simulation of Tony Stark has not returned War Machine's calls. When the A.I. Army was causing their acts of activism, War Machine became a member of Force Works. Following a mission that leaves Gauntlet hospitalized and Solo leaving the team, War Machine leads Quake, U.S. Agent, and Mockingbird on a mission to the island of Lingares where they are ambushed by Deathloks. War Machine, Quake, U.S. Agent, and Mockingbird have been captured by the Deathloks. They are thrown in a cage with some soldiers. Quake states to the soldiers that the dead that captured them are Deathloks. With Quake translating, War Machine, U.S. Agent, and Mockingbird learned that someone called the "Scientist" showed up claiming to help them where he made Deathloks from the fallen countrymen to help deal with a giant. Unfortunately, something went wrong. The Deathloks come in to take some men causing Force Works to fight back. More Deathloks arrive and use their electrical guns to stun them. As the Deathloks start to take War Machine, Quake recovers from the paralysis first and starts to shake the ground without her gauntlets. War Machine fights off his paralysis and starts fighting the Deathloks trying to experiment on him until he is saved by someone he recognizes who is in need of his services. Moments later, War Machine arrives with his armor, U.S. Agent's shield, and the equipment of Quake and Mockingbird as he fights off the Deathloks. As Ultimo continues his attack on the Deathloks, the rest of Force Works learned that War Machine's rescuer is MODOK Superior.

During the "Empyre" storyline, War Machine is recruited to Captain Marvel's personal Accuser Corps and receives a copy of the Universal Weapon that was made by Doctor Strange.

Powers and abilities

Skills
Rhodes was trained as an aircraft pilot and studied aviation engineering while in service with the United States Marine Corps. He is knowledgeable in aircraft operation/maintenance and has piloted various aircraft at Stark Enterprises. Rhodes is an experienced Marine trained in unarmed combat and military weaponry such as small arms. In addition to being a pilot, engineer, Marine, and businessman, Rhodes derives multiple abilities from various hi-tech armors, either designed by Stark Industries or extraterrestrial in nature. With his years of experience with both the Iron Man and War Machine powered armors, Rhodes is skilled in armored combat and uses a more physical fighting style. Compared to Iron Man, his suit is bulkier than Stark's and most of the time physically stronger but slower.  Due to being an early Stark design and updated less than Stark's his suit generally has less cutting-edge tech functions than Iron Man.

Armors

Iron Man Armor IV

 First Appearance: Iron Man #85 (April 1976)

Rhodes' first armor as Iron Man was a solar charged carbon-composite based steel mesh armor which provided him with superhuman-level strength and durability. It was armed with repulsors in each palm of the armor's gauntlets and a multifunctional unibeam projector in the chest.

War Machine Armor
 First Appearance: Iron Man #281 (June 1992)

The original Variable Threat Response Battle Suit Mark I was a version of the Iron Man armor utilizing laser guided munitions. Stark gave Rhodes a modified version of the armor, Mark II Model JRXL-1000, created just for him with the inclusion of repulsors and a unibeam projector. The armor could be modified with various modular weapons and has an improved tactical computer system with automatic targeting. Additional weapons included pulse bolt generators, retractable shoulder minigun, variable-configured double-barrel cannons on each gauntlet, gauntlet mounted flamethrower, plasma blade on the left gauntlet, missile box launcher, micro-rocket launcher, particle beam discharger, and an electromagnetic pulse generator in the unibeam projector that could shut down any electronic device in a 50-mile radius. The armor also included a photon emitter that created a force shield, forcefield-based stealth technology, boot-jet propulsion, and a self-contained breathing system.

The second version of the armor, reconfigured by Stark, contained upgraded improvements such as heat seeking missile launchers, pulse cannon, and retractable weapon pods located on its back. Rhodes utilized different types of specialty ammunition as well as non-lethal weapons such as rubber bullets. Though Rhodes lost the original armor, he still possessed a functional prototype helmet and gauntlet.

Eidolon Warwear
 First Appearance: War Machine #18 (September 1995)

The armor is a symbiotic bio-armor system of alien origin and provided Rhodes with superhuman strength, durability, and speed. The armor responded to Rhodes' commands and created weapons based on his thoughts and needs. When inactive, it was concealed inside a "mandala" or tattoo-like mark on Rhodes' chest. The left arm is capable of firing destructive energy blasts while the right arm is able to morph into a blade. The armor can "unskin" remote drones that are capable of feats such as discharging various types of energy, infiltrating electronic/computer systems, creating energy fields, and completing basic tasks. If the drones are destroyed, Rhodes feels pain due to the symbiotic connection. The armor can morph into a "full battle mode," which provided unspecified enhancement to both the armor and Rhodes himself. It was also capable of space travel with an unlimited life support system. During battle, the armor would have the strange ability to "sing" alien war songs.

Sentinel Squad Armor
 First Appearance: Sentinel Squad O.N.E. #1 (March 2006)

During the Sentinel Squad O*N*E series, he used an armor that was similar to the design of previous Iron Man powered armors and was based on the primary Sentinel piloted armors that the squad used in combat. The armor was derived of S.H.I.E.L.D. technology and Stark-designed upgrades. Rhodes also piloted a larger advanced Sentinel model codenamed "War Machine". The armors were constructed of a unique mix of steel and fiberglass and contained many offensive and defensive improvements in weaponry and enhancements.

Stanetech Based War Machine Armor
 First Appearance: Avengers: The Initiative #1 (March 2007)

Used during Avengers: The Initiative to volume two of War Machine, this version of the War Machine armor shows all the abilities of the previous iterations with bleeding edge military ballistics and weaponry. Unlike previous War Machine armors, the armor incorporated onerousness cybernetic replacements integrated both into the character and the armor itself. James's advanced bionic components derived from Obadiah Stane's reverse engineering of older Iron Man armor that made him immune to any Starktech based systems attack. Rhodes' bionic extremities required an added life support system with integrated implants linked to the armor's systems. The armor and his endo-mantle are composed of alloys such as titanium and Wakandan vibranium, coated for stealth capabilities, and capable of space and underwater travel. Armaments included sonic generators, pulse bolts, a minigun, and a retractable unibeam projector. The technology comprising both it and its wearer can interface with any system and has interlocking capabilities that integrated mechanical constructs to repair and upgrade Rhodey and his suit. During the second War Machine series, Rhodes used this ability to merge with jet fighters and tanks deliberately to gain their technology and weapons. He even temporarily assimilated and expanded on his technoforming through a new form of Techno-Organic Virus, creating whole new mechanical apparatuses for him to use. At the end of the series, Rhodes (now in a cloned version of his body) is seen wearing a non-cybernetic version of the armor.

Satellite Armor
 First Appearance: Iron Man Vol 4 #33 (Nov 2008)

Coming in the form of a massive Satellite Array Tony Stark had built in secret while head of S.H.I.E.L.D. Not even the spy organizations upper echelons nor their governmental backers were aware of its construction. Envisioning a potential extinction level threat to global security on the horizon, a prediction come true during the Secret Invasion. Stark had created the ultimate defensive array for Rhodey's personal use, a privately owned stealth satellite created behind closed doors that would act as a last line of defense for earth. Patterned after the same Stanetech his Initiative Armor is derived from, James could interlock his cyborg components with the stealth ancillary to keep his bionic replacements up and running as well as fuel up the bionics keeping him alive. Through the War Machine Satellite he remains keyed to the grid, constantly streamlining terabytes of raw data the world over without fear of intrusion by outside forces. Connected too yet insulated from the rest of the system, per Stark's recorded message. When commanded this sputnik can transform into a convertible extension of Rhodey's War Machine Armor, becoming a massive Iron Man Model chassis with which to take out entire fleets of space ships. Being one of the most powerful armors Stark has ever created, it mimics much of the War Machine model's functions and weapons systems but massively scaled up. Boasting a giant shoulder mounted cannon & nuclear missile pod, repulsor and unibeam technology and a pincer claw with which to grab and crush opposing vessels. It also boasted protective shielding to defend against destroyer class vessel armory.

War Machine Armor V
 First Appearance: Secret Avengers #1 (May 2010)

Used during issues of Secret Avengers and appearances in other comic series, this upgraded incarnation of the Variable Threat Response Battle Suit has a similar design to the film version of the War Machine armor with armaments similar to previous incarnations such as a retractable shoulder minigun, repulsor technology, and shoulder missile launcher. The armor was destroyed by a nuclear attack in the first arc of the series Iron Man 2.0. A new version of the armor was created after the short-lived Iron Man 2.0 and Iron Patriot series.

"Iron Man 2.0" War Machine Armor
 First Appearance: Iron Man 2.0 #3 (April 2011)

Created in the series Iron Man 2.0 by Tony Stark, this War Machine armor is a complete redesign after the destruction of the previous model. Designed by Iron Man 2.0 artist Barry Kitson, the armor emphasizes stealth, recon, infiltration, and combat readiness. Unlike its predecessors, it is a slimmed down armor with no visible external weaponry such as shoulder miniguns or missile launchers. The armor's color scheme is gunmetal with black detailing and has two lines on the helmet's left eye area that glows according to the repulsor reactor's color. The armor utilizes upgraded technology such as an updated Chameleon Mode (previously a feature of the "Silver Centurion" Iron Man armor) for optical invisibility, holographic projection, and camouflage purposes. The armor also possesses Ghost technology to phase through solid objects, scanner invisibility to become undetectable to all targeting systems, and a Combat Mode that can deploy weaponry which is normally hidden and increase the size and bulk of the armor. But the armor has limitations such as strain of the armor's repulsor reactor, disorientation from the Chameleon Mode, and the inability to be both invisible and intangible at the same time due to a compatibility issue.

Iron Patriot Armor
 First Appearance: Gambit (Vol. 3) #13 (May 2013)
Patterned after Norman Osborn's Iron Patriot armor, this suit is stated to be a prototype model by Rhodes. In addition to shoulder-mounted machine guns, the armor possesses whip-like electroshock weapons that can incapacitate targets. The armor has also demonstrated camouflage and stealth abilities similar to those of the Iron Man 2.0 model.

Manticore Battle Mech
 First Appearance: Tony Stark: Iron Man #2 (Jul 2018)
A high powered multipurpose assault vehicle design thought up by Stark Industries yet sold off by internal moles to Baintronics, Inc. A.I. operated as well as slated for manual operation, The Manticore is stacked to the brim with an amalgam of Bain/Stark technologies incorporated into its construction. In the initial campaign of a performance display to waiting military contractors Iron Man and War Machine would interrupt the demonstration set by rival company head Sunset Bain to any potential buyers after he had found his company secrets had been stolen. As the situation spiraled out of control and Rhodey was left vulnerable due to compounded trauma from his years operating armored suits since his resurrection. The now pilotless mobile tank ran amok without a pilot to operate its functions; needing a change of pace, Jim took the Manticore as his new weapon of choice to compensate for his armor phobia. The automotive itself is outfitted with flight and submersible capabilities, having a host of weaponry capable of taking down helicopters, tanks and even minuscule targets with pinpoint accuracy. Both lethal armaments ranging towards microwave beam-rifles, Gatling guns and missile pods. As well as nonlethal alternatives such as containment foam, soft projectiles for crowd suppression and rubber bullets for dealing with hardier foes without extinguishing their lives.

Reception

Accolades 

 In 2012, IGN ranked War Machine 31st in their "Top 50 Avengers" list.
 In 2020, CBR.com ranked War Machine 16th in their "25 Best Anti-Heroes In Marvel Comics" list.
 In 2021, Screen Rant included War Machine in their "Marvel Comics: 10 Characters With The Best Armor (Who Aren’t Tony Stark)" list.
 In 2021, CBR.com ranked War Machine 2nd in their "10 Strongest Marvel Sidekicks" list.
 In 2022, Collider included War Machine in their "10 Strongest Superhero Sidekicks in Marvel Comics" list.
 In 2022, The A.V. Club ranked War Machine 80th in their "100 best Marvel characters" list.
 In 2022, Sportskeeda ranked War Machine 7th in their "10 Marvel Characters who use guns" list.
 In 2022, Screen Rant included War Machine in their "9 Strongest West Coast Avengers" list.
 In 2022, CBR.com ranked War Machine 10th in their "10 Best Marvel Legacy Heroes" list.

Other versions

Iron Man Noir
In the Marvel Noir universe, James "Jimmy" Rhodes appears as Tony Stark's assistant/friend in the mini-series Iron Man: Noir. In the final issue, he wears and uses a smaller, more stream-lined armor, outfitted with Gatling guns.

Marvel 1602
In Marvel 1602: New World, there is a character named Rhodes, a Moor who is the engineer of the armor worn by the Spanish nobleman Lord Iron. Rhodes accompanied Lord Iron to the New World and assists in Lord Iron's mission to hunt down David Banner, former advisor to King James I of England and the man who tortured Lord Iron when he was captured by the British.

Amalgam Comics
In the Amalgam Comics Universe created by Marvel Comics and DC Comics, there is a character named Stewart Rhodes who appears in the comic Iron Lantern #1. A pilot and engineer employed at Stark Aircraft, he knows the secret of Hal Stark's double life as Iron Lantern. Stewart Rhodes is the amalgam of James Rhodes and John Stewart.

Marvel Zombies
In Marvel Zombies: Dead Days, War Machine is seen on the S.H.I.E.L.D. Helicarrier as a hero that initially survived the zombie plague. He is seen battling zombies, but to prevent infection within him, he ultimately retreats to the helicarrier. Though he is not much seen, his fate is not yet depicted.

Marvel Zombies Return
In Marvel Zombies Return, Zombie Giant Man finds a way to enter parallel universes and invades a universe that resembles the time period in which Tony Stark was an alcoholic. Giant Man infected the parallel universe's Happy Hogan, Pepper Potts and a number of people at Stark Industries. The James Rhodes from the parallel universe finds the Iron Man armor located in a bathroom and puts it on to reach Stark. After Stark sacrifices himself to kill as many zombies as possible, Rhodes takes the name Iron Man and announces he will help the police fend off the zombies. He also becomes a member of this reality's Illuminati. Years later, Rhodes joins the New Avengers in a heavily armed suit reminiscent of the War Machine armor but in the Iron Man color scheme. This Rhodes is at least partly cybernetic, having escaped falling victim to the zombie virus himself by cutting off any of his limbs that has been infected after being bitten to protect himself from the virus, the armor consisting at least partly of cybernetic limbs rather than just a simple suit. The New Avengers team assembled consists of Iron Man and the zombified Spider-Man, Hulk and Wolverine. As part of this, he killed some of the Sentry and Giant Man's undead group team members of the "Avengers". Then, using a nanite virus now infused in Sandman that can kill the zombies forever by engulfing and eating away dead flesh and tissue which is intentionally developed by Spider-Man, the team defeats the zombie Avengers, eradicating the zombie menace for good. He is seen as the last survivor, along with Sandman and Uatu on the last series.

MC2
In the MC2 alternate future, Rhodes gained superhuman powers after exposing himself to experimental microscopic robots. While Tony Stark had intended to test them on himself, Rhodes did not feel it would be right for Stark to unnecessarily risk his life. Although now blessed with exponentially-increasing invulnerability and an impressive array of energy-based attacks, the nanites slowly corrupt Rhodes' mind, eventually destroying his personality and leaving him as little more than a very powerful, humanoid robot. He eventually works as a personal bodyguard for Tony Stark, and although he adopts a superhero uniform (vaguely reminiscent of Superman, though with a different color scheme and no chest insignia) neither he nor Stark bother to come up with a moniker for him. Spider-Girl refers to him as "Fred" for most of her series, for simple lack of anything else to call him.

U.S. War Machine
In the alternate-reality MAX imprint series U.S. War Machine, Tony Stark announces he is retiring from developing weapons after he and his bodyguard Jim Rhodes, who had piloted the MPI-2100 Mobile Infantry Suit a.k.a. the "War Machine" armor, had used lethal force in the defeat of foreign tyrant Doctor Doom's armies. He stated he was mothballing the War Machine armor and presented the SI1-211 "Iron Man" as his new bodyguard. Rhodes, however, uses the War Machine armor to fight rogue agents of the terrorist group Advanced Idea Mechanics, and after killing two of them is fired by Stark. Afterward, former War Machine pilot Parnell Jacobs attacks Rhodes at home in an attempt to steal the War Machine armor. After Rhodes defeats Jacobs, Colonel Nick Fury, head of the espionage agency S.H.I.E.L.D., has Rhodes and Jacobs brought in to the agency's headquarters, the Skycarrier.

Jacobs reveals that his wife, Glenda Sandoval, was taken hostage by A.I.M., with the promise of release if Jacobs delivered the original War Machine armor. But Jacobs had sold that armor to another terrorist group, HYDRA, to gain money when he learned his wife was pregnant. S.H.I.E.L.D. retrieves the armor from HYDRA and, with the guidance of 12-year-old-genius armament designer "Scotch", reverse-engineers its technology to create its own version of the War Machine armor for a planned Special Operations division, dubbed "U.S. War Machine", with Rhodes in charge. Targeting A.I.M., the team includes Jacobs, Dum Dum Dugan, and Sheva Josephs.

In the sequel series U.S. War Machine 2.0., Stark is furious that S.H.I.E.L.D.'s U.S. War Machine division exists and combats it as Iron Man accompanied by his own armored forces—Happy Hogan, Bethany Cabe, and Eddie March—in MPI-2100 Mobile Infantry Suits. Rhodes, now a major, and his division team with Captain America (James "Bucky" Barnes), Sam Wilson, and Clint Barton, to stop Doctor Doom from detonating stolen nuclear weapons planted on the Millennium Wheel in London.

Ultimate Marvel
In the Ultimate Marvel reality, Jim Rhodes first appears as a prep school student and the victim of frequent bullying at the school due to his ethnicity. He comes from a poorer family and the fact that he is there because of the school's racial quota. He finds an unlikely friend in young Tony Stark who defends him against the bullies – much to his dismay because it only serves to attract more attention to himself and, thus, increase his torment. Stark is keen on Rhodes being his friend, while Rhodes, initially, is uneasy about Stark and his burgeoning friendship. Later, after Stark is severely attacked at school and is aided by Rhodes (which turns out to be a peripheral attack on Stark's father), both leave the school and with Stark's father's help, are accepted into the Baxter Building's School for Exceptional Children along with Rhodes's sister, one, because they are all strikingly intelligent, but also for their own protection. Both begin work on different projects and eventually, Stark takes Rhodes into his confidence and allows Rhodes a chance to wear and help design some of the armor he and his father have innovated. Rhodes and Stark's friendship strengthens and Rhodes is later seen making another armor version named "War Machine" which he is going to trade with Stark's "Iron Man" armor when both are fully developed. A couple of years later, Stark and Rhodes, in their respective armor, team up as fake "robots" to take out a terrorist group for the government. This origin, however, was retconned as being a fictionalized history of Tony Stark's early years.

The actual Ultimate Marvel version of James Rhodes is a Sergeant Major in the armed forces and is seen sporting War Machine armor created by Gregory Stark. Both Rhodey and Tony are, for some reason, estranged, later revealed he never received likeness for the "Ultimate Iron Man" cartoon. War Machine saves two abducted U.S. Army officers from the hands of the terrorists. Once the officers had been secured, Rhodes decides to kill the unarmed civilians and the enemy after they surrendered, giving the first glimpse into a more ruthless, apathetic and even sadistic incarnation that's a far cry from earlier views of the character. Later, in France, he attempts to capture Captain America as part of the reactivated "Project Avengers" with new armor that is quite larger, is bloated with numerous ballistic weapons, and can even transform into a German sports car. Rhodes is almost able to capture Captain America, but their last confrontation involves Cap being in a room full of school children. His ruthlessness is shown ever further as he contemplates continuing his attack, until Captain America reminds him that any "Collateral Damage" involving school children would be a Public Relations and Political nightmare prompting War Machine to back off, but for all the wrong reasons. He continues to work for Nick Fury, also recruiting Tyrone Cash during the Ghost Rider incident, and is one of the last Avengers (with Hawkeye, Blade, and Punisher) led by Fury, until his return to S.H.I.E.L.D. Director. More recently, he was seen testing new Stark drones for the Air Force and was approached by Iron Man, with whom he apparently reconciled, to ask him for help against the Mandarin International. He later dons a more simplified War Machine armor, and teams with S.H.I.E.L.D. to free Stark from the Mandarin's Hong Kong facility, after then they rekindled their friendship.

Future
A future equivalent of War Machine is Howard Anthony Stark, the son of Tony Stark and Pepper Potts. He is seen as a cyborg in his own Iron Man armor during a flashforward to an apocalyptic future 41 years ahead where the Mandarin has conquered the world. Howard protects his daughter Ginny Stark while his aged father defeats the Mandarin, sacrificing themselves in the process. At the story's close, Howard gets buried in a gravestone next his mother and father by Ginny. Howard is also said to be 41 years old, suggesting that Howard will be born within the present time.

Secret Wars
During the 2015 "Secret Wars" storyline, a version of Jim Rhodes is a member of the Thor Corps and the Grand Marshall of Baron Stark's region of Battleworld called Technopolis. he also was referred to as iron hammer .

Civil War II
After Rhodes' death in Civil War II, America Chavez takes Kate Bishop to a number of alternate realities during his funeral to show the fates of different versions of him. Earth-55 Rhodes became Iron Man after Stark's death and leads the Avengers. Earth-727 Rhodes became the mayor of Philadelphia after his military career ended. Earth-57289 Rhodes is the C.E.O. of Rhodes Labs International, where Tony Stark works as a scientist. Finally an unknown Earth where Rhodes married Carol Danvers (whom 616 Rhodes was dating before his death).

Spider-Gwen
In the Spider-Gwen universe (Earth-65), "War Machine" refers to the private army of Tony Stark. The Earth-65 version of Frank Castle, a cop on the NYPD, is a former member of War Machine.

Punisher: War Machine
Some time after the events of Secret Empire, Nick Fury Jr. gives The Punisher access to the War Machine armor to combat a rogue state that was caught using old S.H.I.E.L.D. resources. During the aftermath of the operation, Castle resumes his war on crime in New York with the War Machine armor for a brief period of time until his arrest by Fury. The armor is then returned to a recently revived Rhodes.

Collected editions

James Rhodes

Frank Castle

War Machine MAX

In other media

Terrence Howard and Don Cheadle portrayed James Rhodes / War Machine in the Marvel Cinematic Universe.

References

External links
 World of Black Heroes: War Machine Biography
 War Machine at Marvel.com
 

African-American superheroes
Avengers (comics) characters
Black people in comics
Comics characters introduced in 1979
Characters created by David Michelinie
Marvel Comics sidekicks
Cyborg superheroes
Fictional armour
Fictional American scientists and engineers
Fictional fighter pilots
Fictional characters from Philadelphia
Fictional aerospace engineers
Fictional military engineers
Fictional military lieutenants
Fictional United States Marine Corps personnel
Fictional Vietnam War veterans
Iron Man characters
Marvel Comics male superheroes
Marvel Comics military personnel
Marvel Comics American superheroes
Marvel Comics cyborgs